Chen Tan was a Chinese diplomat. He was Ambassador of the People's Republic of China to Syria (1966–1967) and Equatorial Guinea (1971–1974).

References

Ambassadors of China to Syria
Ambassadors of China to Equatorial Guinea
Year of birth missing
Year of death missing
Place of birth missing